Ponmagal Vanthal is a Tamil-language family soap opera series starring Meghna Vincent, Vicky Krish, Shanoor Sana and Vandana Michael. It started airing on 26 February 2018 and ended at 1 February 2020 for 571 episodes on Vijay TV, every Monday to Friday in an afternoon programming block called "Vijay Matinee Thodargal". Later the show was rescheduled to air Monday through Saturday.  The series marks the debut Tamil-language television series for Ayesha of Kerala, who plays the lead role, however she was replaced by Meghna Vincent after episode 105. The series is directed by Gopal Shamugam.

Synopsis
The story is about Rohini, who is loyal to her family. Under certain circumstances, she is forced to marry Gowtham, a man from a rich family. Rohini receives dowry from her mother-in-law Rajeshwari, who tries to cause problems in her life.

Cast

Main
 Ayesha / Meghna Vincent as Rohini Selvam Gautham – Maragatham and Selvam's second daughter; Kaveri and Swathi's sister; Gautam's wife
 Vicky Krish as Gautham Chakravarthy – Rajeshwari and Chakravarthy's younger son; Vishnu's brother; Priya's ex-fiancé; Rohini's husband
 Shanoor Sana as Rajeshwari Chakravarthy – Chakravarthy's wife; Vishnu and Gautam's mother
 Nisha Jagadeeswaran / Vandana Michael as Priya Vishnu – Minister and Pushpa's daughter; Gautam's ex-fiancée; Vishnu's ex-wife

Supporting
 Dharini as Maragatham Selvam – Shanmugam's sister; Selvam's wife; Kaveri, Rohini and Swathi's mother
 Ravishankar as Selvam – Maragatham's husband; Kaveri, Rohini and Swathi's father
 Nathan Shyam as Vishnu Chakravarthy – Rajeshwari and Chakravarthy's elder son; Gautham's brother; Maya and Sartiha's ex-fiancé; Priya's ex-husband; Soumiya's husband
 Ramya Shankar / Archana Harish as Soumiya Vishnu – Vishnu's wife
 Devaraj as Chakravarthy – Rajeshwari's husband; Vishnu and Gautham's father
 Vijay Krishnaraj as Shanmugam – Maragatham's brother; Thamarai's husband; Ashok's father
 Yuvasree as Thamarai Shanmugam – Shanmugam's wife; Ashok's mother
 VJ Mounika / Swetha Venkat as Kaveri Selvam Ashok – Maragatham and Selvam's eldest daughter; Rohini and Swathi's sister; Ashok's wife
 Feroz Khan as Ashok Shamnugam – Shanmugam and Thamarai's son; Kaveri's husband
 Archana Kumar as Swathi Selvam – Maragatham and Selvam's youngest daughter; Kaveri and Rohini's sister
 Sangeetha as Thanam – Housekeeper
 Madhan as Sethu – Rohini's friend
 Mercy Leyal as Pushpa – Minister's wife; Priya's mother
 Ravi Varma as Minister – Pushpa's husband; Priya's father
 Priya Prince as Maya – Vishnu's ex-fiancée
 Akila as Saritha – Vishnu's ex-fiancée
 Sivaranjini as Malini – Priya's friend
 Vincent Roy as Sena 
 Sindhu Shyam

Controversy
Director Nambiraja was accused by Ayesha (the latter who earlier played Rohini) for misbehaving in the shooting spot. The problem was highlighted to the channel and Ayeesha was sacked from playing the lead role in the serial.

References

External links
official website at Hotstar

Star Vijay original programming
2010s Tamil-language television series
2018 Tamil-language television series debuts
Tamil-language television shows
2020 Tamil-language television series endings